The Yoruba calendar (Kọ́jọ́dá) is a calendar used by the Yoruba people of southwestern and north central  Nigeria and southern Benin. The calendar has a year beginning on the last moon of May or first moon of June of the Gregorian calendar. The new year coincides with the Ifá festival.

The traditional Yoruba week has four days. The four days that are dedicated to the Orisa go as follow:

 Day 1 is dedicated to Obatala, Sopona, Iyami Aje, and the Egungun
 Day 2 is dedicated to Orunmila, Esu, and Osun
 Day 3 is dedicated to Ogun & Oshosi
 Day 4 is dedicated to Sango and Oya

To reconcile with the Gregorian calendar, Yoruba people also measure time in seven days a week and four weeks a month. The four-day calendar was dedicated to the Orisas and the seven-day calendar is for doing business.

The seven days are: Ọjọ́-Àìkú (Sunday), Ọjọ́-Ajé (Monday), O̩jọ́-Ìṣẹ́gun (Tuesday), Ọjọ́rú (Wednesday), Ọjọ́bo̩ (Thursday), Ọjọ́-E̩tì (Friday) and O̩jọ́-Àbamé̩ta (Saturday).

Time (Ìgbà, àsìkò, àkókò) is measured in ìṣẹ́jú-àáyá (seconds), ìṣẹ́jú (minutes), wákàtì (hours), ọjọ́ (days), ọ̀sẹ̀ (weeks), oṣù (months) and ọdún (years). 

There are 60 seconds (ọgọ́ta ìṣẹ́jú-àáyá) in 1 minute (ìṣẹ́jú kan); 60 minutes (ọgọ́ta ìṣẹ́jú) in 1 hour (wákàtì kan); 24 hours (wákàtì mẹ́rìnlélógún) in 1 day (ọjọ́ kan); 7 days (ọjọ́ méje) in 1 week (ọ̀sẹ̀ kan); 4 or 5 weeks (ọ̀sẹ̀ mẹ́rìn tàbí márùn-ún) in one month (oṣù kan); 52 weeks (ọ̀sẹ̀ méjìléláàádọ́ta), 12 months (oṣù méjìlá), and 365 days (ọjọ́ mẹ́rìndínláàádọ́rinlélọ́ọ̀ọ́dúnrún) in 1 year (ọdún kan).

Calendar examples

The Yoruba traditional calendar is called “KỌ́JỌ́DÁ” 'Kí ọjọ́ dá,' meaning: may the day be clearly foreseen. 

The traditional Yoruba calendar (Kọ́jọ́dá) has a 4-day week, 7-week month and 13 months in a year. The 91 weeks in a year added up to 364 days.
The Yoruba year spans from 3 June of a Gregorian calendar year to 2 June of the following year. 
According to the calendar developed by Remi-Niyi Alaran, the Gregorian year  AD is the  year of Yoruba records of time.  With the British colonial and European cultural invasions, came the need to reconcile with the Gregorian calendar: Yoruba people also measure time in seven days a week and 52 weeks a year.

Calendar terminologies

Worship of the Òrìṣà in specific months

Ṣẹrẹ/January
 Dedicated to Obatala

Èrèlé/February
 Dedicated to Olóòkun = Òrìṣà of òkun, the deep seas or oceans, patron of sailors, and guardian of souls lost at sea.
Èrèlé/Feb 21-25

Ẹrẹ́nà/March
 Annual rites of passage for men
Ẹrẹ́nà/March 12 – 28

 Dedicated to Oduduwa "Iyaagbe," Òrìṣà of Earth and matron of the Ayé (the world), father of the Yoruba people
Ẹrẹ́nà/March 15 – 19

 Also dedicated to Ọ̀ṣọ́ọ̀sì = Òrìṣà of Adventure and the hunt 
Ẹrẹ́nà/March 21 – 24:

Igbe/April
 Onset of rainy season

Èbìbí/May
 Dedicated to Egúngún (Commemoration of the Ancestors, including community founders and illustrious dead).

Òkúdù/June
 June 3: Onset of the Yoruba New Year ( is the  year of Yoruba culture). Ọrúnmilà / Ifá = Òrìṣà of Divination and custodian of the Ifá. It includes a Mass gathering of the Yoruba in the city of Ife, regarded as the center of creation. 
 Sopona - Òrìṣà of Disease & smallpox, also known as Obaluaye. Ṣọ̀pọ̀na is also the word for smallpox disease. 
 Ọ̀sanyìn - Òrìṣà of Plants, magic, Medicine, and patron of the healing professions
 Òkúdù 10 - 23: Annual rites of passage for women
 Òkúdù 18 - 21: Yemoja = mother of the Òrìṣà, Òrìṣà of fertility, women, and water).

Agẹmo/July
 Agẹmo: first and second weeks in July
 
 Oko (Agriculture) - Harvests & worship of the Òrìṣà of Farming Oko

 Dedicated to Èṣù "Ẹlégba" - one who has power to seize. He is the great Communicator and messenger of the will of Olódùmarè.  

 Dedicated to Ṣàngó "Jakuta" - the Òrìṣà of Energy, àrá (Thunder), and Mànàmáná/Mọ̀nàmọ́ná (lightning)

Ògún/August
 The annual Ọ̀ṣun-Òṣogbo festival occurs in August 
 Dedicated to Ọ̀ṣun - Òrìṣà of Fertility and custodian of the female essence who guides pregnancies to term. 

 Dedicated to Ogun - Òrìṣà of iron/metals (i.e. - a smith), war crafts, hunting, technology and engineering. The custodian of truth and executioner of justice, as such patron of the legal and counselling professions who must swear to uphold truth while biting on a piece of metal. (last weekend of August)

Ọwẹ́wẹ̀ or Owewe/September
 It is the month in which festivals such as New Yam Festivals, are being celebrated and it is a month of blessing. It celebrates how Yoruba is a rich culture.

Ọ̀wàrà or Ọ̀wààrà/October
 Ọ̀wàrà refers to the intense rain showers that occur during the month 
 Dedicated to Oya (Òrìṣà of the river Niger whose is the guardian of gateway between the physical realm (Aye) and the spiritual realm (Òrún).
 Also dedicated to Ṣìgìdì - Òrìṣà of Òrún-Apadi, the realm of the unsettled spirits and the ghosts of the dead that have left Aye and are forsaken of Òrún-Rere (Heaven).
 Also the onset of the dry season

Belu/November

Ọ̀pẹ/December
 Dedicated to Ọbalúayé (Òrìṣà of disease & healing).
 Onset of the Harmattan Season - "Ọyẹ́"

References

External links
 Yoruba calendar, Afropedea

Calendar
Specific calendars